Wanda Mound is a tumulus located in Mogiła (since 1949 a neighbourhood of district Nowa Huta) in Kraków, Poland. The mound is assumed to be the resting place of the legendary princess Wanda. According to one version of the story, she committed suicide by drowning in the Vistula river to avoid unwanted marriage with a German. The mound is located close to the spot on the river bank where her body was found. Archaeological studies, conducted on site in 1913 and in mid-1960, did not provide any conclusive evidence of the mound's age or purpose.

Unlike the other three mounds in Kraków, this one is not located on a natural hill.

The first written record of the mound comes from the 13th century. Within  of the mound-site in 1225 a monastery was built by the bishop of Kraków, Iwo Odrowąż, called the Mogiła Abbey, which is still active today. In 1860 it became a part of Austro-Hungarian fortifications, pulled down only in 1968-1970. In 1890 a monument designed by Jan Matejko was erected at the top: an eagle on a plinth decorated with a relief of a sword and a distaff, below the inscription "Wanda".

See also 
 Krakus Mound, the legendary grave of Princess Wanda's father
 Kościuszko Mound in Kraków
 Piłsudski Mound, also in Kraków

References 

 

Monuments and memorials in Kraków
Landmarks in Poland
Commemorative mounds
Monuments and memorials to women